The 6th Dáil was elected at the September 1927 general election on 15 September 1927 and met on 11 October 1927. The members of Dáil Éireann, the house of representatives of the Oireachtas (legislature) of the Irish Free State, are known as TDs. The 6th Dáil was dissolved on 29 January 1932 by Governor-General James McNeill, at the request of the President of the Executive Council W. T. Cosgrave. The 6th Dáil lasted  days.

Composition of the 6th Dáil

Government party denoted with bullet

Graphical representation
This is a graphical comparison of party strengths in the 6th Dáil from October 1927. This was not the official seating plan.

Ceann Comhairle
On 11 October 1927, Michael Hayes (CnaG), who had been Ceann Comhairle since 1922, was proposed by W. T. Cosgrave and seconded by Thomas Johnson for the position, and was elected without a vote.

On 27 October 1927, Patrick Hogan (Lab) was proposed by Thomas J. O'Connell and Hugh Colohan as Leas-Cheann Comhairle. He was elected by a vote of 91 to 58. On 8 March 1928, Hogan resigned. On 2 May 1928, Daniel Morrissey (Lab) was elected as Leas-Cheann Comhairle on a vote of 79 to 49.

TDs by constituency
The list of the 153 TDs elected, listed by Dáil constituency.

Changes

Notes, citations and sources

Notes

References

External links
Houses of the Oireachtas: Debates: 6th Dáil

 
06
6th Dáil